Linda Bennett (born February 9, 1954) is an American politician. She is a former member of the South Carolina House of Representatives from the 114th District, serving since 2016. She is a member of the Republican party.

In an interview in December 2013, Bennett said of restaurant workers: "If [working in a restaurant] is your lifetime job, God help us. If your lifetime goal is to get up everyday and slap a burger on a bun and give it to someone- you have no life. You don't ever deserve to make anything."

In March 2019, Bennett caused controversy after she posted a misleading photo of Democratic congressman Joe Cunningham (SC-01) on social media.

Electoral history

References

Living people
1954 births
Republican Party members of the South Carolina House of Representatives
21st-century American politicians
University System of Maryland alumni

Women state legislators in South Carolina